Sylvester Marsh (September 30, 1803, Campton, New Hampshire – December 30, 1884, Concord, New Hampshire) was the United States engineer who designed and built the Mount Washington Cog Railway.

Biography
He grew up on a farm, which he worked on, and he attended the common school in the winter.  At 19, he left for Boston, where he worked as a farm hand, and in 1826 he established himself there as a provision dealer. In 1828, he was engaged in Ashtabula, Ohio, in supplying Boston and New York City with beef and pork. He settled in Chicago during the winter of 1833/4, and there followed a similar business until 1837, when his accumulations were swept away in the Panic of 1837. He began again in the grain business, and acquired a substantial fortune. Meanwhile, he worked for the advancement of Chicago.

He invented many appliances that were incidental to meat packing, especially those having reference to the use of steam. He invented the dried-meal process, and “Marsh's caloric dried meal” was long an article of commerce.

In 1855 he moved to Jamaica Plain, Massachusetts, and moved back to Chicago after five years.  He resided a year in Brooklyn, New York, where he was an exporter, sending much of his dried meal product to the West Indies. In 1864 he settled in Littleton, New Hampshire, and after 1879 made Concord, New Hampshire, his residence.

In 1844, he married Charlotte Bates, who died in 1850.  In 1855, he married Cornelia Hoyt.  She and four children survived him.

Cog Railway
While ascending Mount Washington in 1852, he lost his way, and then conceived the idea of building a railroad to its summit, believing that such an enterprise could be made profitable. He obtained a charter for the road on June 25, 1858, but the American Civil War prevented any action until May 1866. The construction of such a road was regarded as impossible, and he became known as “Crazy Marsh”; indeed, the legislature, in granting him a charter, further expressed their willingness to grant a “charter to the moon” if he wished.

Notwithstanding all opposition, he persisted in building the railroad, relying chiefly on his own resources, and received little capital investment until an engine was actually running over part of the route. The peculiar form of locomotive, cog rail, and brakes used were invented by Marsh. The road was formally opened on August 14, 1868, as far as “Jacob's ladder,” and entirely completed in July 1869. During the construction of this road, it was visited by a Swiss engineer, who took away drawings of the machinery and track, from which a similar railway was built up Mount Rigi in Switzerland (see Rigi Railways).

Notes

References
 
 

1803 births
1884 deaths
American engineers
19th-century American inventors
People from Campton, New Hampshire
People from Jamaica Plain